Moonen is a Dutch patronymic surname, derived from Moon, a short form of Simon in Limburg. Among variant forms are Monen, Moons and Moens. Notable people with the surname include:

 (born 1983), Dutch strongman
Andrew J. Moonen (born 1980), American mercenary
Matt Moonen (born 1984), American (Maine) politician
Puck Moonen (born 1996), Dutch racing cyclist
Rick Moonen (born 1977), American chef
Moons
Jan Moons (born 1970), Belgian football goalkeeper
Magdalena Moons (1541–1613), Dutch independence war heroine
Michèle Moons (born 1951), Belgian astronomer
 (1890–1962), Belgian billiards player

See also
Moens, Dutch surname of the same origin
Mones (disambiguation), sometimes a surname

References

Dutch-language surnames
Patronymic surnames